Shur Mast (also Romanized as Shūr Mast) is a village in Rastupey Rural District, in the Central District of Savadkuh County, Mazandaran Province, Iran. At the 2006 census, its population was 187, in 56 families.

References 

Populated places in Savadkuh County